Rabb is an unincorporated community in Nueces County, Texas, United States.  It lies along the Texas Mexican Railway in the northwestern part of the county.

Education
Rabb is served by the Robstown Independent School District.

External links
Handbook of Texas Online

Unincorporated communities in Nueces County, Texas
Unincorporated communities in Texas